Clíona Ní Bhuachalla is an Irish television producer and broadcaster known for working on RTÉ Raidió na Gaeltachta.

Her producing career includes Legend and The Clinic.

She presented the Irish heat for Eurovision Song Contest 1990.

External links
 

Living people
Irish television producers
Irish women television presenters
Irish women television producers
Irish broadcasters
RTÉ Raidió na Gaeltachta presenters
Year of birth missing (living people)